Medicago rigidula, the Tifton burclover, is a species of annual herb in the family Fabaceae. They have a self-supporting growth form and compound, broad leaves. Individuals can grow to 0.50m tall. It is a secondary wild relative of the cultivated crop Barrel Clover (M. truncatula), and a tertiary wild relative of cultivated Alfalfa (M. sativa).

Distribution
The species has a widespread range occurring at elevations between sea level and 1,800 m above sea level. It is native to Albania, Algeria, Baleares, Bulgaria, Corse, Egypt, France, Greece, Italy, Kriti, Krym, Lebanon-Syria, Libya, Morocco, Palestine, Portugal, Romania, Sardegna, Sicilia, South European Russi, Spain, Tunisia, Turkey, Turkmenistan, Ukraine, and Yugoslavia. It was also introduced to California, Czechoslovakia, Great Britain, and Hungary.

Habitat and ecology
The plant species found in a terrestrial ecosystems, in habitats such as temperate forests and grasslands, Mediterranean-type shrublands, and rocky areas (e.g., inland cliffs and mountain peaks).  They can also be artificially found in pastures since it is sometimes cultivated as forage crops. 

Thyme, a dominant aromatic shrub, affects the competitive status of different subsidiary plant species, namely the Medicago minima and the Medicago rigidula. When the Medicago rigidula is grown alone without a competitor, it tends to survive better in soil with thyme than in soil without thyme. This is different than its relative, the Medicago mimima, which can survive the same on soil with or without thyme. In comparison to Medicago rigidula grown on soil with thyme, Medicago rigidula grown on soil without thyme has higher biomass.

Life cycle
Medicago rigidula is an annual with flowers blooming in March and April.

Flowers and fruit

Flowers

The flower of Medicago rigidula is yellow and bilaterally symmetrical.  The flowers can consists of four petals, tepals, and sepals, or five petals, tepals, and sepals.  The petals are often between 2 and 7 millimeters in length. Within the flower, there is a superior ovary and a hypanthium.  The hypanthium provides a cup-like enlargement of the flower and surrounds the fruits.

Fruit

The fruit of Medicago rigidula is a spiral coiled legume with a single carpel that dries but does not split open when ripe. The fruits have hairs on them and are protected with thorn-like defense structures.  The hairs on the fruits aid in seed dispersal by adhering to the fur and feathers of various animals.

Ecological interactions
In laboratory bioassays and field experiments investigating the allelopathic and autotoxic effects of burclover residue on burclover and winter wheat seedlings, the results showed that soils treated with burclover leachates resulted in increased PO4–P, NH4–N, electrical conductivity, total phenolics content, and decreased soil pH. The bioassay results also found that the full-strength leachate of burclover exhibited allelopathy effects on wheat, while growth inhibition of burclover seedlings in the field showed that burclover may have autotoxicity that could reduce productivity.

Usage

Medicinal
Saponins produced by Medicago species are being studied by pharmaceutical companies due to their effectiveness against fungal growth and tumorigenesis.  They have also been found to be toxic to bacteria and certain viruses.  M. rigidula plants were found to have higher concentrations of saponins when compared to other Medicago species.

Other usage
Data has shown that Medicago rigidula can regenerate naturally and form productive pastures in rotation with wheat. Since it is able to tolerate the cold, it is a suitable annual legume that is adapted to the soils and climate of north Syria and the ley-farming system. The successful development of Medicago rigidula cultivars could mean good news for livestock production in west Asia and north Africa.

Conservation status
Although the Medicago rigidula is currently on the IUCN Red List, it is listed as LC or least concern. It has a stable current population trend, and there are neither any extreme population fluctuations nor any extreme subpopulation fluctuations. The population is not severely fragmented and the mature individuals are not on a continuous decline. It is abundant in Turkey and has a stable global population trend but is a protected species in Hungary.

Sources

References

Flora of Malta
rigidula